Alphen may refer to:

Places

Netherlands
Alphen, Gelderland, a village in the municipality West Maas en Waal (province of Gelderland)
Alphen, North Brabant, a village in the municipality Alphen-Chaam (province of North Brabant)
Alphen, South Holland, a former municipality, including Alphen aan den Rijn
Alphen aan den Rijn, a town in the province of South Holland

South Africa
Alphen, a neighborhood in Cape Town

Other uses
Corinne Alphen (born 1954), American model, Penthouse Pet of the Month and actress
Alphen Class, a class of dry cargo ships built in the 1960s for Safmarine

See also
Van Alphen, a surname